Almighty DP is a collaborative Mixtape by hip hop recording artist Chief Keef and producer DP Beats. It was self-released on April 1, 2015. Later in 2015, Keef and DP Beats released a sequel to the project, called Almighty DP 2.

Track listing
All tracks produced by DP Beats.

References

2015 mixtape albums
Chief Keef albums
Self-released albums